Vengeance Is Mine is the eighth studio album by Mentallo & The Fixer, released on July 10, 2001 by Metropolis Records.

Reception

Theo Kavadias of AllMusic gave Vengeance Is Mine three out of five stars, noting the music for lacking direction while crediting it for "introduc[ing] a darker, dirtier electronic sound, both detailed and cluttered" that "conceals gems, and what initially may sound like too much going on actually reveals hidden harmonies, noises, and progressions." Industrial Reviews awarded the album a three out of five, commending the band for embracing more of a dance club oriented sound but criticizing their lack of energy.

Track listing

Personnel
Adapted from the Vengeance Is Mine liner notes.

Mentallo & The Fixer
 Dwayne Dassing (as The Fixer) – vocals, programming, producer, engineering, mixing

Additional performers
 Larry Penn – spoken word (10)

Production and design
 Dwayne Dassing (as The Fixer) – producer, engineering, mixing, editing, mastering
 Rev. Daryl Litts – design, illustrations, photography

Release history

References

External links 
 
 Vengeance Is Mine at iTunes

2001 albums
Mentallo & The Fixer albums
Metropolis Records albums